Sambirania is a genus of beetles in the family Buprestidae, containing the following species:

 Sambirania aeneicollis Descarpentries, 1968
 Sambirania brachysoma Obenberger, 1942
 Sambirania dubia Descarpentries, 1968
 Sambirania impedita Descarpentries, 1968
 Sambirania incerta Descarpentries, 1968
 Sambirania inflata Descarpentries, 1968
 Sambirania plagicollis Descarpentries, 1968
 Sambirania rotundipennis Descarpentries, 1968
 Sambirania suspecta Descarpentries, 1968

References

Buprestidae genera